South Pasadena is a city in Los Angeles County, California, United States. As of the 2010 census, it had a population of 25,619, up from 24,292 in the 2000 census. It is located in West San Gabriel Valley. South Pasadena is the oldest self-builder of floats in the historic Tournament of Roses Parade.

History 

The original inhabitants of South Pasadena and surrounding areas were members of the Native American Hahamog-na tribe, a branch of the Tongva Nation (part of the Shoshone language group) that occupied the Los Angeles Basin. Akuvranga was the Tongva name for the area that covers modern-day South Pasadena and part of Pasadena. Tongva dwellings lined the Arroyo Seco (Los Angeles County) in South Pasadena and south to where it joins the Los Angeles River and along other natural waterways in the city. They lived in thatched, dome-shape lodges characteristic for their use of carved wood decorations. For food, they lived on a diet of corn meal, acorns, seeds and herbs, fish, venison, berries, fruits and other small animals. They traded for ocean fish with the coastal Tongva on a daily basis. They made cooking vessels from steatite soapstone from Catalina Island. South Pasadena also has a strong claim to having the oldest and most historic sites in the San Gabriel Valley. For many centuries, its adjacency to a natural fording place along the Arroyo Seco had served as a gateway to travel and commerce for aboriginal peoples here and along the coast. It was here that Hahamognas greeted Portola and the missionaries who later established the San Gabriel Mission a few miles to the east.

The initial buildings on the Rancho San Pascual were built on the land which eventually became the cities of Pasadena, South Pasadena and Altadena. The first of these adobe structures became headquarters for General Flores and his staff in 1847 where they agreed to surrender to American forces, ending Mexican Colonial rule in California. In 1875, the landowners of the area encompassing present-day Pasadena and South Pasadena voted to rename their association to Pasadena.

South Pasadena's first mayor was Donald McIntyre Graham. In February 1888, members of the southern portion of Pasadena attempted to gain more control over their own property and a vote for incorporation was made. In 1888, South Pasadena incorporated the southern portion of the Indiana Colony and land south and eastward to the Los Angeles border. Few Tongva had received any land. On 2 March 1888, the city of South Pasadena was incorporated with a population slightly over 500 residents, becoming the sixth municipality in Los Angeles County. With the completion of the Pacific Electric Short Line, putting the entire city within easy walking distance of the “red car” stations, South Pasadena also became one of the first suburbs of Los Angeles.

South Pasadena's history is associated with that of the Cawston Ostrich Farm and the Fair Oaks Pharmacy and Soda Fountain, which played vital roles in the history of the city.

Modern South Pasadena 
South Pasadena calls itself the "City of Trees". South Pasadena's streets are lined with numerous species of native California trees. These include redwood, sequoia, ash, walnut, and sycamore. Some non-native trees, such as sweetgum, are also seen. Because there are very few stucco-clad Spanish Colonial houses and virtually no palm trees in some parts of the city, South Pasadena is a popular stand-in for Midwestern and Northeastern towns in motion picture and television productions.

"Mom and Pop" merchants populate the business district, and the Mission West area is a part of the original U.S. Route 66. Of historical relevance is The Fair Oaks Pharmacy and Soda Fountain; also the Rialto Theater in downtown South Pasadena is a unique blend of Spanish Baroque and Egyptian stylings and was built in 1925. It is one of the last remaining single screen cinemas in the country. The Rialto was added to the National Register of Historic Places in 1978, having narrowly missed being torn down that year. It went out of business on August 19, 2007, because of low profits. It has been featured in many films and commercials, most notably Robert Altman's The Player and more recently in La La Land.

The Farmer's Market has become a tradition in the historic Mission-West District of South Pasadena on every Thursday from 4 pm to 8 pm. On the first Saturday of December every year, South Pasadena Booster Club hosts an annual 5K/10K run around South Pasadena known as the "Tiger Run", after the SPHS mascot. Racers from kindergarten to age 80 are invited to participate, including a wheelchair event. The 5K is run on flat sidewalks and roads around town, but the 10K (6.2 miles)  includes some difficult hills. There is also a 300-meter children's run for kids 10 and under.

South Pasadena can often be seen in motion picture productions with its beautiful tree-lined streets and "anywhere in America" feel. Such movies as Freaky Friday, The Terminator, Gone with the Wind, Halloween, Halloween 2, Nightmare On Elm Street, Pee-Wee's Big Adventure, American Pie, The Girl Next Door, Legally Blonde, 13 Going on 30, Back to the Future, Mr. Deeds, Bruce Almighty, Old School, The Ugly Truth, and License to Wed are just a few of the notable films shot on location in South Pasadena. Notable television series that have been filmed there include Parenthood, Family, Boston Public, Nip/Tuck, Desperate Housewives, Cold Case, Bones, Modern Family, No Ordinary Family, Big Love, and CSI: Crime Scene Investigation.

Interstate 710 extension controversy 

South Pasadena, together with a broad coalition of national, state and local organizations, has opposed the 710 Freeway Long Beach Freeway (I-710) extension from Alhambra's Valley Blvd. to the Foothill Freeway (I-210) in Pasadena at California Blvd. The proposed 1960s route would have sliced through the middle of the city, as well as through neighborhoods in El Sereno and Pasadena having an impact on nearly 1,000 homes in its path. However, this incompletion cuts off a north–south route from the San Gabriel Mountains in the north to Long Beach in the south, as well as connecting the 710 to the 110, 134, and 210 freeways.

On July 19, 1999, United States District Court Judge Pregerson issued a preliminary injunction prohibiting defendants Caltrans, et al., from proceeding with the 710 Freeway Project.
The financial support for the fight against a major highway project through the city has come mostly from the residents themselves, who pay legal bills incurred by the city in the freeway fight from their general fund (no special taxes are used), making the fight an ongoing local election issue. South Pasadena has been cited five times on the National Trust for Historic Preservation's list of "Most Endangered Places."

Litigation over the 710 extension has run for over 50 years. The City of South Pasadena has filed a federal lawsuit citing failure to protect clean air, the environment and historic properties, and until the California Department of Transportation (Caltrans) completes a comprehensive new environmental study, this will bring additional delays to the 40-year-old project. Caltrans (the California Department of Transportation) proposed a compromise route of boring a tunnel beneath the city. Having purchased hundreds of properties along the proposed right-of-way in the 1960s, Caltrans proposed selling these in order to partially finance the tunnel. The Southern California real estate boom of the early 2000s caused those properties in South Pasadena alone to appreciate to a combined value of over $300 million. State Senator Carol Liu sponsored a bill to compel Caltrans to sell the properties no longer needed for the project. SB-416 also prohibits funds from the sale of surplus properties in the SR 10 corridor from being used to advance or construct any proposed North State Route 710 tunnel. State Assemblyman Chris Holden co-sponsored the bill and remarked after it was signed into law, "…the surface route of the 710 Freeway is not going to happen and everyone knows that and so these properties should then be put back into the community". Caltrans, however, maintains that the freeway extension/connections are needed for the overall benefit of the Southern California public and continues to fight for its completion.

In May 2017, the MTA board voted unanimously to withdraw its support for the 710 tunnel proposal, and to reallocate all funding previously earmarked for it to surface street and other improvements, effectively killing the project for the foreseeable future. Subsequently, Assemblyman Chris Holden, along with State Senator Anthony Portantino, proposed similar bills effectively deleting the uncompleted portion from the Highway grid.  Both bills were passed and signed by governor Gavin Newsom and the deletion will take effect January 1, 2024.

Fake housing plans 
When South Pasadena was prompted by the state of California to submit plans on how the locality would increase new housing to meet growing housing demands, the city submitted fake housing plans, which included proposals to build housing on plots of land where the city had no intent to build housing. These plots included the locations of City Hall, fire stations and police stations.

Geography 
South Pasadena is located at the western end of the San Gabriel Valley, north of the San Rafael Hills, east of the Arroyo Seco seasonal river, and south of the separate city of Pasadena, California. Adjacent cities are Los Angeles to the west and south, Pasadena to the north, San Marino to the east, and Alhambra to the southeast.

Geographic location 
Diagram showing South Pasadena's location in relation to other cities in an  radius.

Demographics

2010 
The 2010 United States Census reported that South Pasadena had a population of 25,619. The racial makeup of South Pasadena was 13,922 (54.3%) White (43.6% Non-Hispanic White), 771 (3.0%) African American, 107 (0.4%) Native American, 7,973 (31.1%) Asian, 9 (0.0%) Pacific Islander, 1,422 (5.6%) from other races, and 1,415 (5.5%) from two or more races. Hispanic or Latino people of any race were 4,767 persons (18.6%).

The Census reported that 25,456 people (99.4% of the population) lived in households, 8 (0%) lived in non-institutionalized group quarters, and 155 (0.6%) were institutionalized.

There were 10,467 households, out of which 3,621 (34.6%) had children under the age of 18 living in them, 4,904 (46.9%) were opposite-sex married couples living together, 1,264 (12.1%) had a female householder with no husband present, 451 (4.3%) had a male householder with no wife present. There were 501 (4.8%) unmarried opposite-sex partnerships, and 107 (1.0%) same-sex married couples or partnerships. 3,073 households (29.4%) were made up of individuals, and 802 (7.7%) had someone living alone who was 65 years of age or older. The average household size was 2.43. There were 6,619 families (63.2% of all households); the average family size was 3.06.

The population was spread out, with 5,998 people (23.4%) under the age of 18, 1,576 people (6.2%) aged 18 to 24, 7,431 people (29.0%) aged 25 to 44, 7,510 people (29.3%) aged 45 to 64, and 3,104 people (12.1%) who were 65 years of age or older. The median age was 40.1 years. For every 100 females, there were 90.3 males. For every 100 females age 18 and over, there were 85.5 males.

The homeowner vacancy rate was 1.1%; the rental vacancy rate was 6.1%. 13,185 people (51.5% of the population) lived in owner-occupied housing units and 12,271 people (47.9%) lived in rental housing units.

According to the 2010 United States Census, South Pasadena had a median household income of $85,058, with 6.7% of the population living below the federal poverty line.

Economy

Top employers 
According to the city's 2015–2016 Comprehensive Annual Financial Report, the top employers in the city are:

Filming 
Due to its small-town feel and proximity to major film studios, South Pasadena has frequent filming. Scenes from La La Land and Ladybird have been shot here. The town hosts around 200 shoots per year. South Pasadena is also the location of the house of the character Michael Myers from the film Halloween. Other notable films include Old School, Liar, Liar, Beethoven, Back to the Future, and Teen Wolf.

Parks and recreation 
The Arroyo Seco (canyon, stream, and cultural landscape) offers a diverse range of experiences for walkers and more experienced hikers.

The Arroyo Seco stream begins at Red Box near Mount Wilson in the San Gabriel Mountains and proceeds through steep mountain canyons for  until it enters the urban plain of Southern California at the Jet Propulsion Laboratory. The stream, largely channelized south of Devil's Gate Dam, proceeds in the Arroyo Seco canyon for  more: through Pasadena, South Pasadena and Northeast Los Angeles to the confluence with the Los Angeles River near Elysian Park, Chinatown and downtown Los Angeles.

There are 5 parks located within the City of South Pasadena that offer the community family recreation and activities. These are Garfield Park, Eddie Park, Library Park, Orange Grove Park and War Memorial Park.

Government

Local government 
South Pasadena's City Council previously was elected at-large, composed of five members, the mayor chosen from among the City Council members.

Effective November 2018, City Council members are elected by geographical district. Districts 4 and 5 (east of Fair Oaks Avenue) held elections in November 2018. Districts 1, 2 and 3 (west of Fair Oaks Avenue) held elections in November 2020.

The city switched its City Council elections from November of odd-numbered years to November of even-numbered years effective November 2018. Also, the South Pasadena Unified School District holds its Board of Education elections in November of even-numbered years effective November 2018.

The fiscal year 2019-2020 general fund budget for the town was $28.3 million.

List of mayors 
This is a list of South Pasadena mayors by year.
 1964-1966 Burton E. Jones
 1966-1968 Lila Cox
 1968-1972 William C. Harker
 1976-1977 William C. Harker
 1983-1984 Alva Lee Arnold
 1990-1991 Amedee O. "Dick" Richards, Jr.
 1992 Evelyn Fierro
 1994-1995 Amedee O. "Dick" Richards, Jr.
 1996-1997 Dorothy Cohen
 2000-2001 Dorothy Cohen
 2003-2004 Michael A. Cacciotti
 2004-2005 Mike Ten
 2007-2008 Michael A. Cacciotti
 2011-2012 Michael A. Cacciotti
 2013-2014 Marina Khubesrian
 2013-2014 Diana Mahmud
 2014-2015 Robert S. Joe
 December 2015 – 2016 Diana Mahmud 
 2016-2017 Michael A. Cacciotti
 2017-2018 Richard Schneider
2019-2020 Robert Joe
2020-2021 Diana Mahmud
2021-2022 Michael A. Cacciotti

State and federal 

Voting History

Education 

The South Pasadena Unified School District (SPUSD) includes five schools: three elementary schools (Monterey Hills, Marengo and Arroyo Vista), South Pasadena Middle School, and South Pasadena High School. Former elementary schools now closed or renamed are Lincoln (now Arroyo Vista), El Centro (now the school district headquarters), Las Flores (limited grades, near Flores Adobe, historic landmark), and Oneonta (later a private Montessori school).

South Pasadena and the neighboring city of San Marino have had a long-standing rivalry. Until 1955, the two cities shared the same high school, which was adjacent to the South Pasadena Public Library. Every year, the schools' football teams compete for a victor's plaque. As of 2021, South Pasadena team had won 29 and San Marino 35. There have been three ties. Many SPHS team have won CIF titles over the years.

SPEF (South Pasadena Educational Foundation) is a 501(c)(3) charity designated by the SPUSD as the official private fund-raising organization for the support of the district's educational programs.

Infrastructure

Transportation 

Fair Oaks Avenue, Huntington Drive, Fremont Avenue, and Mission Street are the main thoroughfares through South Pasadena.

The Arroyo Seco Parkway, formerly the Pasadena Freeway, has two exits in South Pasadena--Orange Grove Avenue and Fair Oaks Avenue.

LACMTA operates three bus lines (79, 258 & 260) through South Pasadena. The South Pasadena station for the Metro L Line, formerly the Gold Line, is in the heart of South Pasadena, located at the corner of Mission and Meridian.

South Pasadena operates its own public transportation system. Since 2003, South Pasadena has been operating the City of South Pasadena Community Transit to connect with the Mission L Line Station, whose schedule is linked to the L Line schedule. The system was originally called "South Pasadena Gold Link."  Additionally South Pasadena has a transit shuttle that operates around the city. As of 2007, many outdated traffic signals have been replaced throughout South Pasadena.

Health care 
The Los Angeles County Department of Health Services operates the Monrovia Health Center in Monrovia, serving South Pasadena.

Fire 
The South Pasadena Fire Department provides fire protection services for the city of South Pasadena.

Notable people 

 Meredith Baxter, actress, born in South Pasadena
 Whitney Blake, actress, director, producer
 Alison Brie, actress, Community and Mad Men
 Michael Catherwood, radio and television personality
 John Daniel, magician and collector (c. 1931–2011)
 Joe Davis, Los Angeles Dodgers television and Fox Sports play-by-play announcer
 John de Lancie, theater and TV and film actor, Q on Star Trek: The Next Generation
 Kristinia DeBarge, singer, songwriter, reality star; born in South Pasadena
 Andy Dick, actor and comedian
 Thomas Francis Ford (1873–1958), member of Congress, editor, specialist in international trade and the only person ever sent to the Los Angeles City Council by a write-in vote
 Victoria Forester, New York Times best-selling children's book author
 Edward Furlong, actor
 Lucretia Garfield, wife of President James A. Garfield
 William F. Harrah, founder of Harrah's Hotels and Casinos; born in South Pasadena
 William Holden, Academy Award-winning actor
 Minerva Hamilton Hoyt, early activist in California to preserve its deserts
 Porochista Khakpour, Iranian American writer
 Dave King, musician, member of Flogging Molly
 Bob Long, football player for UCLA and 1957 NFL champion Detroit Lions
 Federico Mena, Mexican programmer, creator of the GNOME desktop environment
 Sparky Marcus (real name Marcus Issoglio), child actor
 Noelle Scaggs, singer, musician, member of Fitz and the Tantrums
 Cody McMains, actor
 Joel McCrea, actor, born in South Pasadena
 Jack McGrath, auto racer
 Rich Moore, Emmy-winning animation director (The Simpsons, Futurama), and partner in Rough Draft Studios, Inc. (Glendale, CA)
 Kim Soon-kwon, Korean-born biochemist, specializing in hybrid and engineered corn to combat starvation
 Bronson Pinchot, actor
 James Reynolds, actor, Days of Our Lives
 David Lee Roth, singer, member of Van Halen
 Sakaye Shigekawa, obstetrician
 Hilary Swank, Academy Award-winning actress
 Juan Francisco Azcárate, aircraft designer, Mexico's military attache to Germany and later to the United States during World War II.
 David Tom, actor
 Heather Tom, actress, The Bold and the Beautiful
 Nicholle Tom, actress, The Nanny
 Cheryl Walker, actress, born in South Pasadena
 Jaleel White, actor
 Lisa Yee, children's book author

See also 

 Baranger Studios
 History of Pasadena, California
 Rancho San Pascual
 Tongva people

Gallery

References

External links 

 
 South Pasadena Chamber of Commerce
 South Pasadena Rose Parade Float

 
Cities in Los Angeles County, California
Communities in the San Gabriel Valley
Arroyo Seco (Los Angeles County)
San Rafael Hills
Populated places established in 1888
1888 establishments in California
Incorporated cities and towns in California